Germany is a nation that has competed at fourteen Hopman Cup tournaments and first competed in the inaugural Hopman Cup in 1989 (competing in 1989 under the name West Germany). Germany reached the final for three consecutive years between 1993 and 1995, finishing as the runners-up in 1994 but winning the tournament on the other two occasions.

Players
This is a list of players who have played for Germany in the Hopman Cup.

Results

1 In the last tie against Argentina, Tommy Haas strained his thigh muscle during the singles match and was both forced to retire from this match and forfeit the mixed doubles, thus defaulting both points.
2 Due to a back problem, Nikolas Kiefer was unable to play the final tie against the Netherlands therefore Germany had to forfeit two points.
3 Nikolas Kiefer tore two ligaments in his ankle during his singles match in the final tie against Slovakia. He was forced to retire from that match and was unable to participate in the mixed doubles, thus losing both points.
4 The mixed doubles in the final tie against Kazakhstan was not played.
5 Andrea Petkovic strained her knee and was forced to retire from this match and the mixed doubles, thus losing both points and was replaced by Tajana Malek. Australian junior Thanasi Kokkinakis joined the mixed third rubber match against Serbia after Haas resign.

References

Hopman Cup teams
Hopman Cup